Ancistroides nigrita, the chocolate demon, is a butterfly belonging to the family Hesperiidae.

Subspecies
The subspecies of Ancistroides nigrita found in India are-
 Ancistroides nigrita diocles Moore, 1865 –  (Bengal Chocolate Demon)

References

Ancistroidini
Butterflies of Asia
Butterflies described in 1824
Butterflies of Singapore
Butterflies of Indochina